The Great Britain men's national pitch and putt team represents Great Britain in the pitch and putt international competitions.

It is managed by the British Pitch and Putt Association (BPPA), one of the founders of the European Pitch and Putt Association, the governing body that develops the pitch and putt in Europe and stages the European Team Championship, where Great Britain reached the second place in 1999. In 2006 the "British Pitch and Putt Association" participated in the creation of the Federation of International Pitch and Putt Associations (FIPPA), that stages the World Cup Team Championship.

National team

Players
National team in the European Championship 2010
Steve Deeble
John Deeble
Savio Fernandes
Jamie Deeble
Neil Green
Ron Cope

National team in the World Cup 2008
 Steve Deeble
 John Deeble
 Anthony O'Brien

National team in the European Championship 2007
John Deeble
Steve Deeble
Anthony O'Brien
Geoff Unwin
Ashley Hendricks
Blaise Fernandes

See also
World Cup Team Championship
European Team Championship

External links
BPPA British Pitch and Putt Association  
FIPPA Federation of International Pitch and Putt Associations website
EPPA European Pitch and Putt Association website

National pitch and putt teams
Men's national sports teams of the United Kingdom